The Bisexual Awareness Week, also known as #BiWeek, is an annual celebration held from September 16–23. It is an extension of Celebrate Bisexuality Day, held annually on September 23. The celebration promotes cultural acceptance of the bisexual community, as well as attempts to create a platform for advocating bisexual rights.

According to a 2013 Pew Research Center survey, bisexuals represent approximately 40% of the LGBTQ community. Bisexual Awareness Week is a platform to recognise bisexual and LGBTQ advocacy throughout history.

History 
Bisexual Awareness Week was co-founded by GLAAD and BiNet USA to educate people on obstacles faced by the bisexual community, as well as to set policies that ensure bisexual acceptance and social integration.

See also 

 List of LGBTIQ+ awareness periods
 List of LGBT events

References 

Annual events
Awareness weeks
Bisexual events
September events
LGBT awareness periods